Yankee Clipper can refer to:
 A clipper ship in United States service
 The nickname of Joe DiMaggio, a Major League Baseball player
 Yankee Clipper, a Pan American Airways Boeing 314 Clipper flying boat
 Yankee Clipper, The Apollo 12 command module
 The nickname of Terry Hoitz, a fictional character played by Mark Wahlberg in the 2010 film The Other Guys
 Yankee Clipper (train), passenger train service between New York City and Boston, run by the New York, New Haven and Hartford Railroad
 Yankee Clipper, special-event passenger train service to Yankees–East 153rd Street (Metro-North station)
 Yankee Clipper (Harbor Cruise), a special-event NY Waterway service
 The Yankee Clipper (film), a 1927 maritime adventure film
 American Aviation AA-1 Yankee Clipper, a light aircraft in the Grumman American AA-1 series
 The 1938 New England hurricane, a powerful hurricane that struck Long Island and New England in September of that year
 A Marvel Comics super-hero active during the 1950s appearing in Marvel: The Lost Generation 
 Yankee Clipper, a hydroflume amusement park ride at Six Flags Great America now named AQUAMAN Splashdown.

See also
 Yanky Clippers, a 1929 silent animated film short